Success Will Write Apocalypse Across the Sky (SWWAATS) is an American death metal band from Tampa, Florida, formed in 2006. The group was founded by guitarists Aaron Haines and Ian Sturgill, shortly after the disbandment of their previous band, Bodies in the Gears of the Apparatus. The band's name was inspired by a 1989 text titled "Apocalypse", written by William S. Burroughs (in which "he describes art and creative expression taking a literal and physical form"), and also "inspired and supported by a healthy amount of paranoia," as guitarist Sturgill stated in an interview with About.com.

The group's first release, an EP entitled Subhuman Empire, was released in July 2007 through Debello Recordings. In December 2007, Success Will Write Apocalypse Across the Sky signed a deal with German label Nuclear Blast. The band's full-length debut, The Grand Partition and the Abrogation of Idolatry, was produced, mixed and mastered by guitarist James Murphy, and released on April 3, 2009, in Europe and on May 5, 2009, in the United States.

The lyrical themes of Success Will Write Apocalypse Across the Sky, which were defined by Exclaim! magazine as "a big 'fuck you' to all of humanity," address topics like "wage slavery, psychological warfare, 'denial and contortion' of human rights, globalism, and eugenics". Vocalist John Collett cites authors such as H. P. Lovecraft, Mark Twain, Bram Stoker, and Ambrose Bierce as some of his lyrical influences.

Members

Current members
Ian Sturgill – guitars, backing vocals (2006–present)
John Collett – lead vocals (2007–present)
Jennifer Muse – samples (2008–present)
Matt Simpson – bass (2008–present)
Shaun De Leon – guitars (2012–present)

Former members
JR Daniels – drums
Aaron Haines – guitars
Chris Woodall – bass
Mike Petrak – drums
Jesse Jolly – bass
Pete Lamb – drums

Session and touring members
Mike Heller – drums (2009)
Sally Gates – guitar (2009)
Angel Cotte – drums (2013)

Discography 
Subhuman Empire EP (2007)
The Grand Partition and the Abrogation of Idolatry (2009)

References

External links 

Death metal musical groups from Florida
Musical groups established in 2006
Musical groups from Tampa, Florida
Nuclear Blast artists